Niels Erik Leschly (23 February 1910 – 2 November 1986) was a Danish equestrian. He competed in two events at the 1936 Summer Olympics.

References

1910 births
1986 deaths
Danish male equestrians
Olympic equestrians of Denmark
Equestrians at the 1936 Summer Olympics
Sportspeople from Copenhagen
People from Gentofte Municipality